Uranium(III) chloride, UCl3, is a water soluble salt of uranium.  UCl3 is used mostly to reprocess spent nuclear fuel.  Uranium(III) chloride is synthesized in various ways from uranium(IV) chloride; however, UCl3 is less stable than UCl4.

Preparation
There are two ways to synthesize uranium(III) chloride.  The following processes describe how to produce uranium(III) chloride.

(1) In a mixture of NaCl-KCl at 670–710 °C, add uranium tetrachloride with uranium metal.
3UCl4 + U → 4UCl3

(2) Heat uranium(IV) chloride in hydrogen gas.
2UCl4 + H2 → 2UCl3 + 2HCl

Properties
In solid uranium(III) chloride each uranium atom has nine chlorine atoms as near neighbours, at approximately the same distance, in a tricapped trigonal prismatic configuration.

Uranium(III) chloride is a green crystalline solid at room temperature.  UCl3 melts at 837 °C and boils at 1657 °C.  Uranium(III) chloride has a density of 5500 kg/m3 or 5.500 g/cm3.

Its composition by weight:
Chlorine: 30.84%
Uranium: 69.16%

Its formal oxidative states:
Chlorine: −1
Uranium: +3

This salt is very soluble in water and is also very hygroscopic.  UCl3 is more stable in a solution of hydrochloric acid.

Uses

Reagent
Uranium(III) chloride is used in reactions with tetrahydrofuran (THF) and sodium methylcyclopentadiene to prepare various uranium metallocene complexes.

Catalyst
Uranium(III) chloride is used as a catalyst during reactions between lithium aluminium hydride (LiAlH4) and olefins to produce alkyl aluminate compounds.

Molten form
The molten form of uranium(III) chloride is a typical compound in pyrochemical processes as it is important in the  reprocessing of spent nuclear fuels. UCl3 is usually the form that uranium takes as spent fuel in electrorefining processes.

Hydrates
There are three hydrates of uranium(III) chloride:
UCl3.2H2O.2CH3CN
UCl3.6H2O
UCl3.7H2O

Each are synthesized by the reduction of uranium(IV) chloride in methylcyanide (acetonitrile), with specific amounts of water and propionic acid.

Precautions
While there are no long-term data on the toxic effects thas UCl3, it is important to minimize exposure to this compound when possible.

Similar to other uranium compounds that are soluble, UCl3 is likely absorbed into the blood through the alveolar pockets of the lungs within days of exposure.  Exposure to uranium(III) chloride leads to toxicity of the renal system.

References

External links 
 Uranium(III) chloride information at Webelements
 Uranium(III) chloride International Bio-Analytical Industries, Inc.
Depleted Uranium: All the Questions about DU and Gulf War Syndrome are Not Yet Answered

Uranium(III) compounds
Chlorides
Actinide halides